Lisandro Agustín Cabrera (born 4 January 1998) is an Argentine professional footballer.

Early life
Cabrera was born in the city of Quitilipi in Argentina's northern Chaco Province. Cabrera was signed by Boca Juniors' academy from Juventud Cooperativista, which preceded him joining Newell's Old Boys in 2018.

Club career

Newell's Old Boys
Having been moved into their senior side in September 2018, Cabrera made his professional debut during a home defeat to Atlético Tucumán on 3 September; he was subbed on for Braian Rivero on seventy-five minutes. Cabrera featured three more times in his opening month in all competitions, prior to starting a Primera División game for the first time on 8 October against Colón.

In January 2019, Cabrera joined Cúcuta Deportivo on loan. He scored vs. Deportivo Pasto on 3 April. In July, having ended his loan with Cúcuta Deportivo in June after thirteen total appearances and a further goal versus Valledupar in the cup, Cabrera returned to Colombia on loan with Patriotas. However, he left weeks later after being told he wasn't going to be selected at first-team level. On 27 August, Cabrera was loaned to Gimnasia y Esgrima back in his homeland.

York United
On 18 November 2020, Cabrera joined Canadian Premier League club York United. While awaiting his Canadian visa, he was loaned to Atlético Pantoja in the Dominican Republic, with York being able to recall him as soon as his visa was processed. On April 16 Cabrera scored Pantoja's first ever goal in CONCACAF Champions League play against Monterrey.On June 2 he and York teammate and fellow Atletico Pantoja loanee Mateo Hernández were loaned to Costa Rican club Guadalupe of the Liga FPD. In December 2022, Cabrera departed the club, after his 2023 option was declined.

Career statistics
.

References

External links

1998 births
Living people
Association football forwards
Argentine footballers
Sportspeople from Chaco Province
Argentine expatriate footballers
Expatriate footballers in Colombia
Argentine expatriate sportspeople in Colombia
Expatriate soccer players in Canada
Argentine expatriate sportspeople in Canada
Expatriate footballers in the Dominican Republic
Argentine expatriate sportspeople in the Dominican Republic
Expatriate footballers in Costa Rica
Argentine expatriate sportspeople in Costa Rica
Newell's Old Boys footballers
Cúcuta Deportivo footballers
Patriotas Boyacá footballers
Gimnasia y Esgrima de Mendoza footballers
York United FC players
Atlético Pantoja players
Guadalupe F.C. players
Argentine Primera División players
Categoría Primera A players
Primera Nacional players
Liga Dominicana de Fútbol players
Liga FPD players